This is a list of major urban development projects in Tokyo, Japan.

See also
 
 
 
 '''

Development
Tokyo, development
Development projects